The Gadsden Confederate Memorial was installed in Quincy, Florida, United States. The memorial was removed in June 2020.

See also
 List of monuments and memorials removed during the George Floyd protests

References

Monuments and memorials in the United States removed during the George Floyd protests
Gadsden County, Florida
Monuments and memorials in Florida